Nothing To Prove is Jeffries Fan Club's second album. A music video was made for the song "Nothing To Prove".

Track listing
 "Something Good" – 2:54
 "One More Time" – 3:08
 "Had To Be That Way" – 3:17
 "Close Your Mind" – 3:41
 "Rolled" – 3:35
 "Crystal 52" – 2:49
 "Alone" – 2:17
 "I'm Not The Type" – 2:50
 "Walking Backwards" – 2:57
 "She's So Cool" – 2:41
 "I Can Live With That" – 2:58
 "Like A Dog" – 2:18
 "Rosarito" – 2:03
 Instrumental Song
 "Nothing To Prove" – 2:57
 "I Want To Be In Jeffries Fan Club" – 2:58
 Secret Track

Personnel
Chris Colonnier - Trombone
Derek Gibbs - Bass guitar
Mike Dziurgot - Vocals & Guitar
Justin Ferreira - drums
Chris Rush - Trumpet
Sonnie Johnston - Guitar

Use in popular culture
The songs "Rolled" and "Crystal 52" were used in the DCOM Johnny Tsunami.

1999 albums
Jeffries Fan Club albums